The 2019 European Parliament election was held between 23 and 26 May 2019, the ninth parliamentary election since the first direct elections in 1979. A total of 751 Members of the European Parliament (MEPs) represent more than 512 million people from 28 member states. In February 2018, the European Parliament had voted to decrease the number of MEPs from 751 to 705 if the United Kingdom were to withdraw from the European Union on 29 March 2019. However, the United Kingdom participated alongside other EU member states after an extension of Article 50 to 31 October 2019; therefore, the allocation of seats between the member states and the total number of seats remained as it had been in 2014. The Ninth European Parliament had its first plenary session on 2 July 2019.

On 26 May 2019, the European People's Party led by Manfred Weber won the most seats in the European Parliament, making Weber the leading candidate to become the next President of the European Commission. Despite this, the European Council decided after the election to nominate Ursula von der Leyen as new Commission President. The centre-left and centre-right parties suffered significant losses, while pro-EU centrist, liberal and environmentalist parties and anti-EU right-wing populist parties made substantial gains.

New law
On 7 June 2018, the Council agreed at ambassador level to change the EU electoral law and to reform old laws from the 1976 Electoral Act. The purpose of the reform is to increase participation in elections, raise understanding of their European character and prevent irregular voting while at the same time respecting the constitutional and electoral traditions of the member states. The reform forbids double voting and voting in third countries, thus improving the visibility of European political parties. To avoid double voting, contact authorities are established to exchange data on voters, a process that has to start at least six weeks before the elections.

The European Parliament gave its consent on 4 July 2018 and the Act was adopted by the Council on 13 July 2018. However, not all member states ratified the Act prior to the 2019 elections and therefore this election took place in line with the previous rules.

Political groups and candidates

The  process involves the nomination by European political parties of candidates for the role of Commission President, the party winning the most seats in the European Parliament receiving the first opportunity to attempt to form a majority to back their candidate (akin to how heads of government are elected in national parliamentary democracies). This process was first used in 2014 and was opposed by some in the European Council. The future of the process is uncertain, but the European Parliament has attempted to codify the process and the parties are almost certain to select the candidates again.

In May 2018 a Eurobarometer poll suggested that 49% of the 27,601 individuals from all 28 EU countries surveyed think that the  process will help them vote in the next European elections while 70% also think that the process requires a real debate on European issues.

European People's Party
Incumbent Jean-Claude Juncker stated he would not seek a second term as President of the European Commission.

Two candidates sought the nomination of the EPP:
 Alexander Stubb, the Vice-President of the European Investment Bank, former Prime Minister, Foreign Minister and Finance Minister of Finland.

At their 2018 Congress in Helsinki, the EPP elected Manfred Weber as their  for President of the European Commission.

Party of European Socialists
Previous candidate Martin Schulz left the European Parliament in 2017 to head the Social Democratic Party of Germany, but he stepped down from the latter position in 2018.

Two candidates were nominated by PES member parties and organisations:
 Maroš Šefčovič (Vice-President of the Commission) announced in September his bid to head the Commission.
 Frans Timmermans (first Vice-President of the Commission, previous Dutch Foreign Affairs Minister) announced in October his bid to head Commission.

Šefčovič announced his withdrawal in November and supported Frans Timmermans as the Common Candidate.

The party convened an extraordinary Congress in Lisbon to ratify the election of the candidate and to vote upon the manifesto.

European Conservatives and Reformists

European Green Party
As in 2014, the Greens adopted the principle of having two leading candidates for the European Elections 2019. Unlike in 2014, where the candidates were chosen through an open online primary elections, the two leading candidates were elected by the Council of the Party in Berlin in November 2018. Four people, two of them being currently MEPs, have declared their candidacy:
 Petra De Sutter (Senator and member of the Parliamentary Assembly of the Council of Europe and candidate of Groen in the 2019 elections)
 Ska Keller (MEP and candidate of Alliance 90/The Greens in the 2019 elections).
 Bas Eickhout (MEP and candidate of GroenLinks in the 2019 elections)
 Atanas Schmidt (nominated by Zelena Partija, Bulgaria)

At their 2018 Congress in Berlin, the party elected Ska Keller and Bas Eickhout as their  for the President of the European Commission.

European Free Alliance

Alliance of Liberals and Democrats
Rather than present a single candidate, the ALDE group presented a Team Europe of seven people as the alliance's leading candidates:
 Guy Verhofstadt (President of the ALDE group, MEP and former Prime Minister of Belgium)
 Nicola Beer (General Secretary and lead candidate of the Free Democratic Party in Germany)
 Margrethe Vestager (Commissioner for Competition, previous Danish Minister for Economy and Interior).
 Luis Garicano (chief economist for Ciudadanos in Spain)
 Emma Bonino (Former European Commissioner for Health and Consumer Protection, former Italian Minister of Foreign Affairs)
 Violeta Bulc (Commissioner for Transport, former Deputy Prime Minister of Slovenia)
 Katalin Cseh (founder of Hungary's Momentum Movement)

Party of the European Left 
The designated candidates are Violeta Tomič from Slovenia and Belgian trade-unionist Nico Cué.

Populist and Eurosceptic groups 
The Europe of Freedom and Direct Democracy was widely expected to disband after the election. One reason was that its biggest share of MEPs came from the United Kingdom, which was long expected to leave the EU before the election. The second was that the second-biggest partner, Italy's Five Star Movement (M5S), felt uneasy about this alliance anyway, having unsuccessfully tried to join the Greens/EFA or ALDE group instead. In February 2019, M5S alongside partners from Croatia, Finland, Greece and Poland presented a new alliance of anti-establishment parties that claim to be neither left nor right.

The Movement is an alliance of populist parties set up by Steve Bannon in 2018 with the purpose of contesting the European elections. Participating parties included, at least temporarily, Lega Nord, People's Party of Belgium and Brothers of Italy and possibly French National Rally. Originally envisioned as an attempt to unite the populist parties in Europe, The Movement has so far been snubbed by the Alternative for Germany, the Freedom Party of Austria and the UK Independence Party. In March 2019, reporters assessed Bannon's project as a failure. Shortly ahead of the election, Marine Le Pen of the French National Rally distanced herself from Bannon, clarifying that he played no role in her party's campaign.

In April 2019, Matteo Salvini of Italy's Lega launched the European Alliance of Peoples and Nations as a new coalition of populist, hard Eurosceptic and anti-immigration parties. It has been joined by most of the members of the outgoing Europe of Nations and Freedom group (including Lega, the French National Rally, Freedom Party of Austria and the Dutch Party for Freedom) as well as some former EFDD (Alternative for Germany) and ECR parties (Danish People's Party and Finns Party). It has been predicted to become the fourth largest group in parliament with an estimate of more than 80 MEPs.

New parties
2019 saw the debut of new  parties such as Wiosna of Poland, Czech Pirate Party of Czech Republic, USR-PLUS of Romania, Human Shield and Most of Croatia, ĽSNS and Progressive Slovakia of Slovakia. Some of the new parties have already joined European parties, e.g. LMŠ of Slovenia is a member of ALDE.

The biggest new party is La République En Marche! (LREM) of French President Emmanuel Macron that was formed in 2016 and won the French presidential and parliamentary elections of the following year. Initially, it balked at joining any of the existing party families, instead trying to form a new parliamentary group of pro-European centrists who support Macron's plans to reform the European institutions, drawing away members from ALDE, EPP and S&D. Possible partners for such a project were expected to include Spanish Ciudadanos, Progressive Slovakia and the Hungarian Momentum Movement. However, the hypothetical group was considered to have difficulties to find MEPs from at least seven member states as is required to form a new group. In November 2018, LREM decided to cooperate with the liberal ALDE group instead. Nevertheless, Macron stressed that this was merely a loose alliance and his party is not a member of the ALDE Europarty. He bluntly criticised ALDE for accepting donations from the Bayer-Monsanto chemical group while LREM's campaign chief threatened to recall the alliance. In April and May 2019, LREM continued its efforts to build a broader group, including ALDE, but also centrist and centre-left parties outside of ALDE.

The new Brexit Party won 29 seats in the United Kingdom.

The European Spring initiated from the Democracy in Europe Movement 2025 ran as a pan-European party alliance with one unified vision for Europe, the European Green New Deal. The most prominent figure is the former Greek minister Yanis Varoufakis, who ran as a candidate in the constituency of Germany, but failed to secure a seat. Despite garnering approximately one and a half million votes, no representatives who ran DiEM25 were elected, due to the votes being dispersed throughout different EU countries.

As a new pan-European party, Volt Europa was founded in different European countries two years before the elections and successfully campaigned in eight EU countries for the elections with one transnational programme. Despite missing its own goal to create a parliamentary group on its own, approximately half a million votes in total were sufficient to send one of the founders, Damian Boeselager, into the European Parliament via a German Volt list. Since June 2019, Volt is part of the group of the Greens/EFA.

Televised debates

Results

Groups

By country

Post-Brexit seats

In June 2018, the European Council decided to reapportion 27 of the 73 seats which would become vacant in the event of the United Kingdom leaving the EU. As the United Kingdom was still a member of the EU at the time of the election, the elections were held with the same allocation of seats as in 2014. When the United Kingdom left the EU, 27 of the seats were reallocated to other EU member states as shown below, resulting in a total of 705 MEPs.

Changes in group representation
The table below shows the changes in group composition after the United Kingdom left the EU.

Seat projections
There were no pan-European polls for the European elections. However, several organisations calculated the theoretical seat distribution in the European Parliament based on national polls in all member states. The table below displays these different projections. Since the United Kingdom notified its intention to leave the European Union in March 2017, the United Kingdom was expected not to participate in the European elections and was therefore excluded from projections. On 10 April 2019, the European Council extended the Brexit deadline to 31 October 2019, and the UK did participate in the European elections. The UK was included in most projections after that date.

Percent
The following table shows projections with vote share instead of seats.

Aftermath

President of the Commission Approval 

The heads of governments, gathered in a European Council on 1–3 July 2019, could not agree on a consensus President of the Commission. The two Spitzenkandidaten were discussed, but neither Manfred Weber (EPP), nor Frans Timmermans (PES), who had the backing of many leaders but not of those from the Visegrád Group, had a majority.

In the final hours of the vote, the name of Ursula von der Leyen was suggested and agreed to by all governments, with Germany's abstention.

The European Parliament voted to approve her nomination on 16 July.

Le Grand Continent published a detailed analysis of the secret ballot. The authors numbered the public pledges of national delegations and individual MEPs as amounting to 410, which is 27 more than what von der Leyen ultimately received. 
To explain the difference, they suggested three scenarios: one in which the support of delegations from the S&D group (some for, some against, some equivocal) was lower than admitted, another in which MEPs from the populist parties in government (Poland's PiS, Hungary's Fidesz and Italy's M5S) were claiming support only to gain leverage, and a half-way scenario which they see as the likeliest. In two of these three scenarios, the S&D group, which for decades was the pillar of the Grand coalition in Europe, no longer has a majority of MEPs supporting the Commission.

See also
List of European Parliament elections by state (includes 2019 elections)

References

External links 

Official results